MFPS may refer to:
 First-person shooter, a video game
 Mannosylfructose-phosphate synthase, an enzyme
 Franciscan Minims of the Perpetual Help of Mary, (mfPS) a Catholic Religious Order founded in Mexico in 1942 (Mínimas Franciscanas del Perpetuo Socorro de María)